Carnival Paradise (formerly Paradise) is a  operated by Carnival Cruise Line. Built by Kværner Masa-Yards at its Helsinki New Shipyard in Helsinki, Finland, she was floated out on 29 January 1998, and christened as Paradise by Paula Zahn.  During 2007, in common with all of her Fantasy-class sisters, she had the prefix Carnival added to her name.

History
Carnival Paradise was built to be the world's first completely non-smoking cruise ship and she was entered into service supported by several anti-smoking and cancer-prevention groups. "No smoking" signs were placed prominently on both sides of the ship and on the stern under the name.

Non-smoking rules were strictly enforced. No smoking materials of any kind were permitted aboard. If anything was seen or found, the passenger was fined $250 and put off at the next port, with their transportation home under the passenger's own expense. Due to poor revenue, Carnival decided to discontinue the smoke-free policy in December 2003, claiming that non-smokers tend to not drink or gamble as much as those accustomed to smoke.

Scheduled to arrive at the Port of Long Beach, California, on 20 September 2004, her arrival was delayed due to several major hurricanes (see 2004 Atlantic hurricane season). Her cruise through the Caribbean and Panama Canal, and up the Mexican coast was further hindered by more hurricanes. After having skirted the bad weather with minimal inconvenience, Paradise arrived at the Long Beach cruise terminal in the early morning. Later that day, the non-smoking signs were painted over.

In 2021, she was repainted into Carnival's new livery.

Service history 
After her arrival in Long Beach, she undertook 3-day and 4-day cruises to Ensenada, Mexico and Santa Catalina Island, California.

In late 2011, Carnival moved Carnival Paradise to Tampa, replacing the Carnival Inspiration, which went to California. Currently, Carnival Paradise takes 4 and 5 night voyages to Grand Cayman and Cozumel, Mexico. The ship also used to sail to Havana, Cuba and Key West, Florida on select sailings from 2017 to 2019.

In 2018, she underwent a month-long dry dock in Freeport, Bahamas, which added a 14th deck to the front of the ship to accommodate 38 new cabins.

Gallery

References

Notes

Bibliography

External links

Official website
Carnival Paradise Photo Gallery

Paradise
Fantasy-class cruise ships
1998 ships
Ships built in Helsinki